Vitis californica, with common names California wild grape, Northern California grape, and Pacific grape, is a wild grape species widespread across much of California as well as southwestern Oregon.

The California wild grape grows in canyons, alongside springs, streams. It tends to thrive in damp conditions and so it is common in riparian areas. It can be found on slopes as well as flat ground in wetland and forested habitats. Once matured like most other native California plants it can withstand periods of dry conditions.

Description
Vitis californica is a deciduous vine distributed along the Coast Ranges from Douglas County, Oregon, south to San Luis Obispo County, California; in the Klamath Mountains, the Cascade Range, and the Sierra Nevada from Siskiyou to Kern counties, California; and in the Central Valley. It is fast growing and it can grow to over 10 m (33 ft) in length. It climbs on other plants or covers the ground with twisted, woody ropes of vine covered in green leaves. In the fall the leaves turn many shades of orange and yellow before losing its leaves then in the spring it flowers typically in May and June.

Bunches of small and often sour but edible purple grapes hang from the vines in autumn, which can be made into wine or jelly. The grapes provide an important food source for a variety of wild animals, especially birds, and the foliage provides thick cover. The grapes are a common sight along the banks of the Sacramento River.

Cultivation

Viticulture
The wild grape is strong and robust, and viticulturists worldwide often use it as rootstock for their wine grapes. It prefers heavier soils. In some areas where the plant is not native it has the capacity to become a noxious weed. Though its invasive nature can be kept under control and is very easy to pull out.

Horticulture
Vitis californica is cultivated as an ornamental plant. The interesting shape and color of the leaves and the lush, trainable vines make this species an attractive garden plant. This vine is commonly used in native plant gardens, where once established it thrives without summer water.

The cultivar '' (named for noted horticulturist Roger Raiche) turns brilliant red in fall. It is a hybrid with a wine grape, × Vitis vinifera cv. Alicante Bouschet. The cultivar 'Walker Ridge' turns yellow in the autumn.

References

External links
 UWash Science: Vitis californica propagation protocol
  Jepson Manual eFlora (TJM2) treatment of Vitis californica
 USDA Plants Profile: Vitis californica (California wild grape)
 US Forest Service Fire Ecology
 
 
 
 USDA Plant Guide: California Wild Grape
 University of San Diego Plant Details: California Wild Grape (Vitis californica)
 USDA Vitis Californica In Fire Effects Information System
 Calscape: Vitis californica (California Grape)
 Nation Library of Medicine: Hybridization of cultivated Vitis vinifera with wild V. californica and V. girdiana in California
 Pacific Horticulture: Vitis Rogers Red

californica
Flora of California
Flora of Oregon
Flora of the Klamath Mountains
Flora of the Sierra Nevada (United States)
Fruits originating in North America
Natural history of the California chaparral and woodlands
Natural history of the California Coast Ranges
Natural history of the Central Valley (California)
Natural history of the San Francisco Bay Area
Natural history of the Transverse Ranges
Plants used in Native American cuisine
Plants described in 1844
Bird food plants
Garden plants of North America
Drought-tolerant plants
Vines
Flora without expected TNC conservation status